was a town located in Monbetsu District, Abashiri Subprefecture (now Okhotsk Subprefecture), Hokkaido, Japan.

As of 2004, the town had an estimated population of 2,618 and a population density of 9.73 persons per km2. The total area was 269.10 km2.

On October 1, 2005, Ikutahara, along with the town of Maruseppu, and the village of Shirataki (all from Monbetsu District), was merged into the expanded town of Engaru.

Climate

References

Dissolved municipalities of Hokkaido